Steven Riley is a professor of infectious disease dynamics at Imperial College London. He is a member of the Scientific Pandemic Influenza Modelling group (SPI-M) of SAGE.

References

External links 
https://twitter.com/srileyidd?lang=en
https://www.researchgate.net/scientific-contributions/Steven-Riley-39361468
https://orcid.org/0000-0001-7904-4804

Living people
Year of birth missing (living people)
Academics of Imperial College London
Alumni of the University of Oxford
Academic staff of the University of Hong Kong